Dominik Furch (born April 19, 1990) is a Czech professional ice hockey goaltender who is currently playing for HC Kometa Brno of the Czech Extraliga (ELH).

Playing career
He was previously under contract with Severstal Cherepovets and Avangard Omsk of the Kontinental Hockey League (KHL) and has played in the Czech Extraliga with HC Slavia Praha.

On 2 May 2019, Furch signed his first contract in Sweden as a free agent, agreeing to a one-year deal with Örebro HK of the Swedish Hockey League (SHL). As the starting goaltender for Örebro HK, Furch enjoyed a successful 2019–20 season, posting a 2.26 goals against average in 46 regular season games.

In the off-season, Furch opted to return to the KHL, agreeing to a one-year contract with Belarusian club, HC Dinamo Minsk, on 3 July 2020.

References

External links
 

1990 births
Living people
Avangard Omsk players
Czech ice hockey goaltenders
HC Dinamo Minsk players
Färjestad BK players
HC Kometa Brno players
Severstal Cherepovets players
HC Slavia Praha players
Örebro HK players
HC Plzeň players
BK Havlíčkův Brod players
HC Berounští Medvědi players
Ice hockey people from Prague
Czech expatriate ice hockey players in Russia
Czech expatriate ice hockey players in Sweden
Expatriate ice hockey players in Belarus
Czech expatriate sportspeople in Belarus